Jack Alexander (August 15, 1914 – February 13, 1984) was a minor league baseball player and an American football player and coach.

Alexander played collegiate football at Duke University in Durham, North Carolina form 1933 to 1935.

References

External links

1914 births
1984 deaths
Baseball second basemen
Baseball third basemen
Akron Yankees players
Amsterdam Rugmakers players
Binghamton Triplets players
Brevard Tornados football coaches
Bradford Blue Wings players
Duke Blue Devils football players
Norfolk Tars players
People from Haywood County, North Carolina
Sportspeople from Asheville, North Carolina
Players of American football from North Carolina
Baseball players from North Carolina